Young may refer to:

 Offspring, the product of reproduction of a new organism produced by one or more parents
 Youth, the time of life when one is young, often meaning the time between childhood and adulthood

Music
 The Young, an American rock band
 Young, an EP by Charlotte Lawrence, 2018

Songs
 "Young" (Baekhyun and Loco song), 2018
 "Young" (The Chainsmokers song), 2017
 "Young" (Hollywood Undead song), 2009
 "Young" (Kenny Chesney song), 2002
 "Young" (Place on Earth song), 2018
 "Young" (Tulisa song), 2012
 "Young", by Ella Henderson, 2019
 "Young", by Lil Wayne from Dedication 6, 2017
 "Young", by Nickel Creek from This Side, 2002
 "Young", by Sam Smith from Love Goes, 2020
 "Young", by Silkworm from Italian Platinum, 2002
 "Young", by Vallis Alps, 2015
 "Young", by Pixey, 2016

People

Surname
 Young (surname)

Given name
 Young (Korean name), Korean unisex given name and name element
 Young Boozer (born 1948), American banker and Alabama State Treasurer
 Young Tonumaipea (born 1992), Samoan-Australian rugby league footballer
 Young Vivian (born 1935), Niuean politician who has twice been the premier of Niue

Nickname
 Young Aaron (Barney Aaron), English-born American lightweight, Hall of Fame
 Young Murphy (Jack Bernstein), American world champion junior lightweight boxer
 Young Perez (Victor Perez), Tunisian world champion flyweight boxer
 Osman the Young, Ottoman sultan

Places

Australia
 Young, New South Wales, Australia, a town
 Young County, New South Wales
 Young Shire, New South Wales
 Electoral district of Young, New South Wales
 Young River (Western Australia)

United States
 Young, Arizona, an unincorporated community
 Young, Indiana, an unincorporated town
 Young County, Texas
 Young, West Virginia, an unincorporated community
 Young Township (disambiguation)
 Young State Park, Michigan
 Young Conservation Area, Missouri
 Young Lake, a lake in Herkimer County, New York
 Young's Park (Overland Park, Kansas)
 Young Park (Las Cruces, New Mexico)

Elsewhere
 Young, Saskatchewan, Canada, a village
 Young, Uruguay, a city
 Young River (New Zealand)
 Young Point (Antarctica)
 Young Island (disambiguation), various
 Young (crater), on the Moon
 Young Sound, Greenland

Other uses 
 , the name of more than one United States Navy ship
 Young baronets, five baronetcies, four of which are extant
 Young (mango), a named mango cultivar that originated in south Florida
 Young (wine)
 Young Broadcasting, a defunct American broadcasting company
 Young's, a British pub chain

See also

 
 
 Forever Young (disambiguation)
 List of people known as the Young
 Jung (disambiguation)
 Justice Young (disambiguation)
 Youngs (disambiguation)
 Yung (disambiguation)